Begleiter is a surname. Notable people with the surname include:

Steven Begleiter, poker player
Ralph Begleiter (born 1949), American journalist and educator
Henri Begleiter (1935–2006), American neurophysiologist